SC Swettl is an Austrian association football club playing in the city of Zwettl.The club plays in the 4th tier 1. Niederösterreichische Landesliga.

Current squad

External links
  http://www.sc.zwettl.at/  Official Website

Zwettl
Zwettl, SC
Association football clubs established in 1945
1945 establishments in Austria